Basse-Terre 2nd Canton is a former canton in the Arrondissement of Basse-Terre on the island of Guadeloupe. It had 4,612 inhabitants (2012). It was disbanded following the French canton reorganisation which came into effect in March 2015. It comprised part of the commune of Basse-Terre, which joined the new canton of Basse-Terre in 2015.

See also
Cantons of Guadeloupe
Communes of Guadeloupe
Arrondissements of Guadeloupe

References

Former cantons of Guadeloupe